The Tempe Elementary School District is a school district in Tempe, Arizona.

The Tempe Elementary School District is located in the heart of the “Valley of the Sun”. It encompasses an area of approximately  including not only Tempe but also parts of Phoenix and the Town of Guadalupe. Arizona State University, the fifth largest campus in the nation (with more than 50,000 students) is within the district's boundaries providing professional and educational opportunities.

The 21 schools in the Tempe Elementary School District consist of 14 elementary schools grades kindergarten through five, a developmental special needs school, an Intervention Learning Program middle school, four middle schools grades six through eight, a k-8 school, and a K-8 traditional school.

Preschools
 Getz School

Elementary schools
 Aguilar Elementary School
 Arredondo Elementary School
 Broadmor Elementary School
 Carminati Elementary School
 Curry Elementary School
 Frank Elementary School
 Fuller Elementary School
 Holdeman Elementary School
 Hudson Elementary School
 Nevitt Elementary School
 Rover Elementary School
 Scales Technology Academy
 Thew Elementary School
 Wood Elementary School

Middle schools
 Connolly Middle School
 Gililland Middle School
 Fees College Preparatory Middle School
 Tempe Academy of International Studies - McKemy Campus

K-8 schools
 Ward Traditional Academy
 Laird School

Native American absenteeism
In 2007, it launched a program to reduce absenteeism among its 1,200 Native American students. A district supervision commented that some Native American parents had negative perceptions of schools. The program includes liaisons with parents and help with resources ranging from alarm clocks to transportation.

See also
Tempe Union High School District
Kyrene School District

References

School districts in Maricopa County, Arizona
Education in Tempe, Arizona
1874 establishments in Arizona Territory
School districts established in 1874